The 1912 Summer Olympics (Swedish: Olympiska sommarspelen 1912), officially known as the Games of the V Olympiad, were an international multi-sport event held in Stockholm, Sweden, between 5 May and 22 July 1912.  Twenty-eight nations and 2,408 competitors, including 48 women, competed in 102 events in 14 sports.

Athletics

Cycling

Diving

Men

Women

Equestrian

Fencing

Football

Gymnastics

Modern pentathlon

Rowing

Sailing

Shooting

Swimming

Men's events

Women's events

Tennis

Men's events

Women's events

Mixed events

Tug of war

Water polo

Wrestling

Notes

See also
 1912 Summer Olympics medal table

External links

medal winners
Lists of Summer Olympic medalists by year